Sphaerolejeunea umbilicata is a species of liverworts in the Lejeuneaceae family. It is endemic to Colombia.  Its natural habitat is subtropical or tropical moist lowland forests.

Sources

Lejeuneaceae
Critically endangered plants
Endemic flora of Colombia
Taxonomy articles created by Polbot